The 1988 United States House of Representatives election in Vermont was held on November 8, 1988. Republican nominee Peter Plympton Smith defeated independent candidate Bernie Sanders and Democratic nominee Paul N. Poirier.

Incumbent Republican Representative Jim Jeffords chose to run for a seat in the United States Senate instead of seeking reelection to the  United States House of Representatives. Former Lieutenant Governor Peter Plympton Smith won the Republican nomination against David Gates. State Representative Paul N. Poirier won the Democratic nomination against Peter Welch, James A. Guest, and Dolores Sandoval. Sanders, the Mayor of Burlington, Vermont ran as an independent candidate.

This is the most recent election in which a Republican was elected to the U.S. House of Representatives from Vermont's at-large congressional district.

Background

From 1854 to 1958, the Vermont Republican Party won every statewide election in Vermont. William H. Meyer became the first member of the Democratic Party to win a statewide election in Vermont since 1853, when he won election to the United States House of Representatives from Vermont's at-large congressional district in the 1958 election.

Jim Jeffords, a member of the Republican Party, was elected from Vermont's at-large district in the 1974 election and served for fourteen years. In the 1986 election he faced no Democratic opponent and won with 89.12% of the popular vote against three other candidates.

Campaign

Candidates

Major parties

Republican

Senator Robert Stafford, who had been appointed to the United States Senate in 1971, announced on April 10, 1987, that he would not seek reelection in the 1988 election. Representative Jeffords announced that he would seek the Republican nomination to succeed Stafford in the United States Senate instead of seeking reelection to the United States House of Representatives.

Dennis Delaney, a member of the Vermont Senate, considered running in a congressional, gubernatorial, or lieutenant gubernatorial election.

Smith had run in the 1986 gubernatorial election with the Republican nomination, but placed second to Democratic Governor Madeleine Kunin in the popular vote and in the Vermont General Assembly vote as no candidate had received more than 50% of the popular vote. David Dillon served as Smith's campaign manager.

Smith defeated Gates in the primary with 77.60% of the popular vote.

Democratic

On April 8, 1987, Paul N. Poirier, the Majority Leader of the Vermont House of Representatives, announced that he would seek the Democratic nomination for congressional election.

Poirier defeated Welch, Guest, and Sandoval in the primary with 41.27% of the popular vote.

Minor parties and other candidates

Independent

Bernie Sanders won election as Mayor of Burlington, Vermont, in the 1981 mayoral election as an independent and won reelection in the 1983, 1985, and 1987 elections. Sanders had run for governor in the 1986 election and had received 14.45% of the popular vote in the election and support from one member of the state legislature. During the 1987 campaign Sanders stated that he would not seek reelection in 1989, stating that "eight years is enough and I think it is time for new leadership, which does exist within the coalition, to come up". Sanders announced on March 10, 1988, that he would run in the election as an independent candidate. Terry Bouricius served as Sanders' campaign treasurer. During the campaign he received the support of the Rainbow Coalition.

Other

Jim Hedbor announced that he would run in the election with the Libertarian nomination on February 25, 1988, at a press conference in Montpelier, Vermont. Hedbor won the Libertarian primary without opposition.

Peter Diamondstone, who had unsuccessfully ran for a seat in the United States House of Representatives five times, announced on June 3, 1988, that he would run in the election with the nomination of the Liberty Union Party. Diamondstone faced no opposition in the party's primary. Diamondstone also sought the position of Vermont Attorney General during the 1988 election. During the campaign he accused his opponents of excluding the candidates of smaller parties from debates and forums.

Morris Earle, who had unsuccessfully ran in five elections including for Vermont's at-large congressional district in 1986, announced that he would run and appeared on the Small Is Beautiful ballot line.

General election

Three debates was held during the campaign which were attended by all of the candidates. Two candidates forums were held with one on foreign policy and the other on elderly issues.  Smith accused Poirier of conducting a negative campaign while Poirier questioned Smith's statements that he had founded and served as president of the Community College of Vermont.

A straw poll of the six candidates was conducted during one of the debates in which they were asked who they would support if they were not on the ballot. Smith and Earle stated that they would support Poirier, Sanders stated that he would support Earle, Poirier stated that he would support Sanders, and Diamondstone refused to vote.

Smith won in the general election with 41.20% of the popular vote against Sanders' 37.49% and Poirier's 18.88%. Smith won the popular vote in eight counties while Sanders won the popular vote in five counties. Smith's victory was the last time that a member of the Republican Party was elected to the United States House of Representatives from Vermont.

Polling

Endorsements

Results

Results by county

Results by municipality

References

1988
Vermont
1988 Vermont elections
Bernie Sanders